Reza Negarestani (born 1977) is an Iranian philosopher and writer, known for "pioneering the genre of 'theory-fiction' with his book" Cyclonopedia which was published in 2008. It was listed in Artforum as one of the best books of 2009. Negarestani directs the critical philosophy programme at The New Centre for Research & Practice.

Philosophical work
Negarestani has been a regular contributor to Collapse, as well as other print and web publications such as Ctheory. On March 11, 2011, faculty from Brooklyn College and The New School organized a symposium to discuss Cyclonopedia titled Leper Creativity. Later on in the year, Punctum books published a book with the same title that included essays, articles, artworks, and documents from or related to the symposium.  In 2011, he co-edited Collapse's issue VII with Robin Mackay titled "Culinary Materialism". In 2012, Negarestani collaborated with Florian Hecker on an artwork titled "Chimerization" that was included in the dOCUMENTA (13) exhibition. He has since written librettos for a series of full-length albums based on Hecker's concept of 'chimerization'.

After being associated with the philosophical movement of speculative realism for several years, Negarestani has since lectured and written about rationalist universalism beginning with the evolution of the modern system of knowledge and advancing toward contemporary philosophies of rationalism, their procedures as well as their demands for special forms of human conduct.

After going through different philosophical phases starting with Nick Land and subsequently speculative realism, Negarestani turned to rationalist inhumanism, according to which the concept of the human is under-explored and is a matter of theoretical and practical investigation, the results of which will lead to a thoroughgoing new conception of the human that stands in opposition to classical versions of humanism and human essentialism. Research paradigms such as artificial general intelligence and neuroscience, according to Negarestani, provide insights as how the concept of the human is underdeveloped and must be understood as a subject of critical construction. Accordingly, Negarestani's philosophical project deals with what he calls a philosophy of intelligence as in contrast to the philosophy of mind. For Negarestani, the philosophy of intelligence goes beyond the philosophy of mind insofar as the concept of intelligence is beholden to a system of socially constituted thoughts and practices through which the intelligible is recognized. However, for Negarestani the term  remains a philosophically vague concept, an explicandum. With a nod to Rudolf Carnap's project of explication, Negarestani instead proposes a conceptual engineering whereby the concept of intelligence is progressively replaced by its explicata, or refined concepts which methodically address different issues with regard to the question of "what is intelligence". For Negarestani, such issues span ontological, epistemological, methodological, technical and axiological concerns. Negarestani's emphasis on the necessary link between what we mean by intelligence and what it takes to render the world intelligible borrows elements from transcendental philosophy, German idealism and systematic skepticism.

Negarestani's blog, Toy Philosophy, "focus[es] on various threads—some still loose and some already converged—of [his] philosophical research".

Bibliography

Books
Cyclonopedia: Complicity with Anonymous Materials (Re.Press, 2008)
(edited with Robin Mackay) Collapse Volume VII: Culinary Materialism (Urbanomic, 2012)
Torture Concrete: Jean-Luc Moulène and the Protocol of Abstraction (Sequence Press, 2014)
Intelligence and Spirit (Urbanomic x Sequence Press, 2018)
Abducting the Outside: Collected Writings 2003–2020 (Urbanomic. Sequence Press, 2021)
Chronosis (Urbanomic, 2021)

References

External links 

 "Toy philosophy", Reza Negarestani's blog
 Interview with Fabio Gironi at Nero Editions
 Conversation with Robin Mackay at Urbanomic
 The Question of Will
 Three Nightmares of the Inductive Mind
 Inhuman Symposium at Fridericianum
 Cybernetics: Intelligence and Imagination at École normale supérieure

Continental philosophers
Living people
21st-century Iranian philosophers
1977 births
Weird fiction writers